Battle Ramla may refer to three battles fought near Ramla, now in Israel:
Battle of Ramla (1101)
Battle of Ramla (1102)
Battle of Ramla (1105)

See also
 1948 Palestinian expulsion from Lydda and Ramle